Qaleh-ye Sheykh (also Romanized as Qal`eh-ye Sheykh and Qal‘eh Shaikh) is a village in Hayaquq-e Nabi Rural District, in the Central District of Tuyserkan County, Hamadan Province, Iran. At the 2006 census, its population was 122, in 36 families.

References 

Populated places in Tuyserkan County